The 1992–93 season was the second season of competitive football in Ukraine.

National team

Ukraine national football team 

Ukraine finished their first year of international competition with a loss versus Hungary and a draw in Belarus. The side's first ever victory came in May of the following year with a win away at Lithuania.

Friendlies

UEFA Competitions

UEFA Champions League

After finishing at the top of the Premier League table during the previous season, Tavriya Simferopol entered the qualifying stages of the first season of the rebranded UEFA Champions League. They were the first club to represent Ukraine on the European stage, progressed in the Preliminary round by defeating Irish champions Shelbourne on aggregate and eventually lost to Swiss side Sion on aggregate in the First round.

Preliminary round

|}

First round

|}

Cup Winners' Cup

Chornomorets Odessa, winners of the previous season's Cup, started in the Qualifying round of the UEFA Cup Winners' Cup with progressing against FC Vaduz, winning in both legs with aggregate 12–1, and lost in the First round to Greece representative Olympiacos with winning 1–0 away and losing 0–3 at home.

Qualifying round

|}

First round

|}

UEFA Cup

Dynamo Kyiv represented Ukraine in the UEFA Cup for the first time as runners-up of the previous Vyshcha Liha season, where they started in the First round with eliminating Rapid Wien on away goals and reached the second round before losing decidedly to Belgian side R.S.C. Anderlecht.

First round

|}

Second round

|}

Men's club football
Pre-season promotion and relegation

Note: For all scratched clubs, see section Clubs removed for more details

Vyshcha Liha (Top League)

Persha Liha (First League)

Druha Liha (Second League)

Perekhidna Liha (Transitional League)

Ukrainian Cup

Final

Notes

 
Seasons in Ukrainian football